Montana was admitted to the Union on November 8, 1889, and elects U.S. senators to Classes 1 and 2. Its current U.S. senators are Democrat Jon Tester (serving since 2007) and Republican Steve Daines (serving since 2015), making it one of five states to have a United States Senate delegation split between Republican and Democratic caucusing senators.

List of senators

|- style="height:2em"
| colspan=3 | Vacant
| nowrap | Nov 8, 1889 –Jan 1, 1890
| Montana elected its first senators two months after admission to the Union.
| rowspan=3 | 1
| rowspan=2 
| rowspan=5 | 1
| Montana elected its first senators two months after admission to the Union.
| nowrap | Nov 8, 1889 –Jan 2, 1890
| colspan=3 | Vacant

|- style="height:2em"
! rowspan=2 | 1
| rowspan=2 align=left | Wilbur F. Sanders
| rowspan=2  | Republican
| rowspan=2 nowrap | Jan 1, 1890 –Mar 3, 1893
| rowspan=2 | Elected in 1890.Lost re-election.
| rowspan=4 | Elected in 1890.Retired.
| rowspan=4 nowrap | Jan 2, 1890 –Mar 3, 1895
| rowspan=4  | Republican
| rowspan=4 align=right | Thomas C. Power
! rowspan=4 | 1

|- style="height:2em"
| 

|- style="height:2em"
| colspan=3 | Vacant
| nowrap | Mar 3, 1893 –Jan 16, 1895
| Legislature failed to elect.
| rowspan=4 | 2
| rowspan=2 

|- style="height:2em"
! rowspan=3 | 2
| rowspan=3 align=left | Lee Mantle
| rowspan=2  | Republican
| rowspan=3 nowrap | Jan 16, 1895 –Mar 3, 1899
| rowspan=3 | Elected to finish vacant term.Lost renomination.

|- style="height:2em"
| 
| rowspan=4 | 2
| rowspan=4 | Elected in Jan 1895.Lost re-election.
| rowspan=4 nowrap | Mar 4, 1895 –Mar 3, 1901
| rowspan=4  | Republican
| rowspan=4 align=right | Thomas H. Carter
! rowspan=4 | 2

|- style="height:2em"
|  | SilverRepublican
| 

|- style="height:2em"
! 3
| align=left | William Clark
|  | Democratic
| nowrap | Mar 4, 1899 –May 15, 1900
| Elected in 1899.Resigned to avoid claim of election fraud.
| rowspan=5 | 3
| rowspan=2 

|- style="height:2em"
| rowspan=2 colspan=3 | Vacant
| rowspan=2 nowrap | May 15, 1900 –Mar 7, 1901
| rowspan=2 | Clark was appointed to continue his term, but did not qualify.

|- style="height:2em"
| rowspan=2 
| rowspan=4 | 3
| rowspan=4 | Elected in 1901.Retired.
| rowspan=4 nowrap | Mar 4, 1901 –Mar 3, 1907
| rowspan=4  | Democratic
| rowspan=4 align=right | William Clark
! rowspan=4 | 3

|- style="height:2em"
! rowspan=2 | 4
| rowspan=2 align=left | Paris Gibson
| rowspan=2  | Democratic
| rowspan=2 nowrap | Mar 7, 1901 –Mar 3, 1905
| rowspan=2 | Elected to finish Clark's term.Retired.

|- style="height:2em"
| 

|- style="height:2em"
! rowspan=3 | 5
| rowspan=3 align=left | Thomas H. Carter
| rowspan=3  | Republican
| rowspan=3 nowrap | Mar 4, 1905 –Mar 3, 1911
| rowspan=3 | Elected Jan 16, 1905.Lost re-election.
| rowspan=3 | 4
| 

|- style="height:2em"
| 
| rowspan=3 | 4
| rowspan=3 | Elected Jan 16, 1907.Lost re-election as a Progressive.
| rowspan=3 nowrap | Mar 4, 1907 –Mar 3, 1913
| rowspan=3  | Republican
| rowspan=3 align=right | Joseph M. Dixon
! rowspan=3 | 4

|- style="height:2em"
| 

|- style="height:2em"
! rowspan=6 | 6
| rowspan=6 align=left | Henry L. Myers
| rowspan=6  | Democratic
| rowspan=6 nowrap | Mar 4, 1911 –Mar 3, 1923
| rowspan=3 | Elected Mar 2, 1911.
| rowspan=3 | 5
| 

|- style="height:2em"
| 
| rowspan=3 | 5
| rowspan=3 | Elected Jan 14, 1913.
| rowspan=10 nowrap | Mar 4, 1913 –Mar 2, 1933
| rowspan=10  | Democratic
| rowspan=10 align=right | Thomas J. Walsh
! rowspan=10 | 5

|- style="height:2em"
| 

|- style="height:2em"
| rowspan=3 | Re-elected in 1916.Retired.
| rowspan=3 | 6
| 

|- style="height:2em"
| 
| rowspan=3 | 6
| rowspan=3 | Re-elected in 1918.

|- style="height:2em"
| 

|- style="height:2em"
! rowspan=15 | 7
| rowspan=15 align=left | Burton K. Wheeler
| rowspan=15  | Democratic
| rowspan=15 nowrap | Mar 4, 1923 –Jan 3, 1947
| rowspan=3 | Elected in 1922.
| rowspan=3 | 7
| 

|- style="height:2em"
| 
| rowspan=3 | 7
| rowspan=3 | Re-elected in 1924.

|- style="height:2em"
| 

|- style="height:2em"
| rowspan=6 | Re-elected in 1928.
| rowspan=6 | 8
| 

|- style="height:2em"
| rowspan=2 
| rowspan=6 | 8
| Re-elected in 1930.Died.

|- style="height:2em"
| rowspan=2 |  
| rowspan=2 nowrap | Mar 2, 1933 –Mar 13, 1933
| rowspan=2 colspan=3 | Vacant

|- style="height:2em"
| rowspan=3 

|- style="height:2em"
| Appointed to continue Walsh's term.Lost nomination to finish Walsh's term.
| nowrap | Mar 13, 1933 –Nov 6, 1934
|  | Democratic
| align=right | John E. Erickson
! 6

|- style="height:2em"
| rowspan=2 | Elected to finish Walsh's term.
| rowspan=14 nowrap | Nov 7, 1934 –Jan 3, 1961
| rowspan=14  | Democratic
| rowspan=14 align=right | James E. Murray
! rowspan=14 | 7

|- style="height:2em"
| rowspan=3 | Re-elected in 1934.
| rowspan=3 | 9
| 

|- style="height:2em"
| 
| rowspan=3 | 9
| rowspan=3 | Elected to full term in 1936.

|- style="height:2em"
| 

|- style="height:2em"
| rowspan=3 | Re-elected in 1940.Lost renomination.
| rowspan=3 | 10
| 

|- style="height:2em"
| 
| rowspan=3 | 10
| rowspan=3 | Re-elected in 1942.

|- style="height:2em"
| 

|- style="height:2em"
! rowspan=3 | 8
| rowspan=3 align=left | Zales Ecton
| rowspan=3  | Republican
| rowspan=3 nowrap | Jan 3, 1947 –Jan 3, 1953
| rowspan=3 | Elected in 1946.Lost re-election.
| rowspan=3 | 11
| 

|- style="height:2em"
| 
| rowspan=3 | 11
| rowspan=3 | Re-elected in 1948.

|- style="height:2em"
| 

|- style="height:2em"
! rowspan=12 | 9
| rowspan=12 align=left | Mike Mansfield
| rowspan=12  | Democratic
| rowspan=12 nowrap | Jan 3, 1953 –Jan 3, 1977
| rowspan=3 | Elected in 1952.
| rowspan=3 | 12
| 

|- style="height:2em"
| 
| rowspan=3 | 12
| rowspan=3 | Re-elected in 1954.Retired.

|- style="height:2em"
| 

|- style="height:2em"
| rowspan=3 | Re-elected in 1958.
| rowspan=3 | 13
| 

|- style="height:2em"
| 
| rowspan=3 | 13
| rowspan=3 | Elected in 1960.
| rowspan=9 nowrap | Jan 3, 1961 –Jan 12, 1978
| rowspan=9  | Democratic
| rowspan=9 align=right | Lee Metcalf
! rowspan=9 | 8

|- style="height:2em"
| 

|- style="height:2em"
| rowspan=3 | Re-elected in 1964.
| rowspan=3 | 14
| 

|- style="height:2em"
| 
| rowspan=3 | 14
| rowspan=3 | Re-elected in 1966.

|- style="height:2em"
| 

|- style="height:2em"
| rowspan=3 | Re-elected in 1970.Retired.
| rowspan=3 | 15
| 

|- style="height:2em"
| 
| rowspan=7 | 15
| rowspan=3 | Re-elected in 1972.Died.

|- style="height:2em"
| 

|- style="height:2em"
! rowspan=10 | 10
| rowspan=10 align=left | John Melcher
| rowspan=10  | Democratic
| rowspan=10 nowrap | Jan 3, 1977 –Jan 3, 1989
| rowspan=7 | Elected in 1976.
| rowspan=7 | 16
| rowspan=5 

|- style="height:2em"
|  
| nowrap | Jan 12, 1978 –Jan 22, 1978
| colspan=3 | Vacant

|- style="height:2em"
| Appointed to finish Metcalf's term.Lost nomination to full term.Resigned early to give successor preferential seniority.
| nowrap | Jan 22, 1978 –Dec 14, 1978
|  | Democratic
| align=right | Paul G. Hatfield
! 9

|- style="height:2em"
|  
| nowrap | Dec 14, 1978 –Dec 15, 1978
| colspan=3 | Vacant

|- style="height:2em"
| Appointed early to finish Metcalf's term, having already been elected to the next term.
| rowspan=19 nowrap | Dec 15, 1978 –Feb 6, 2014
| rowspan=19  | Democratic
| rowspan=19 align=right | Max Baucus
! rowspan=19 | 10

|- style="height:2em"
| 
| rowspan=3 | 16
| rowspan=3 | Elected in 1978.

|- style="height:2em"
| 

|- style="height:2em"
| rowspan=3 | Re-elected in 1982.Lost re-election.
| rowspan=3 | 17
| 

|- style="height:2em"
| 
| rowspan=3 | 17
| rowspan=3 | Re-elected in 1984.

|- style="height:2em"
| 

|- style="height:2em"
! rowspan=9 | 11
| rowspan=9 align=left | Conrad Burns
| rowspan=9  | Republican
| rowspan=9 nowrap | Jan 3, 1989 –Jan 3, 2007
| rowspan=3 | Elected in 1988.
| rowspan=3 | 18
| 

|- style="height:2em"
| 
| rowspan=3 | 18
| rowspan=3 | Re-elected in 1990.

|- style="height:2em"
| 

|- style="height:2em"
| rowspan=3 | Re-elected in 1994.
| rowspan=3 | 19
| 

|- style="height:2em"
| 
| rowspan=3 | 19
| rowspan=3 | Re-elected in 1996.

|- style="height:2em"
| 

|- style="height:2em"
| rowspan=3 | Re-elected in 2000.Lost re-election.
| rowspan=3 | 20
| 

|- style="height:2em"
| 
| rowspan=3 | 20
| rowspan=3 | Re-elected in 2002.

|- style="height:2em"
| 

|- style="height:2em"
! rowspan=11 | 12
| rowspan=11 align=left | Jon Tester
| rowspan=11  | Democratic
| rowspan=11 nowrap | Jan 3, 2007 –Present
| rowspan=3 | Elected in 2006.
| rowspan=3 | 21
| 

|- style="height:2em"
| 
| rowspan=5 | 21
| rowspan=3 | Re-elected in 2008.Resigned to become U.S. Ambassador to China.

|- style="height:2em"
| 

|- style="height:2em"
| rowspan=5 | Re-elected in 2012.
| rowspan=5 | 22
| rowspan=3 

|- style="height:2em"
|  
| nowrap | Feb 6, 2014 –Feb 9, 2014
| colspan=3 | Vacant

|- style="height:2em"
| Appointed to finish Baucus's term.Ran for election to full term, but withdrew.
| nowrap | Feb 9, 2014 –Jan 3, 2015
|  | Democratic
| align=right | John Walsh
! 11

|- style="height:2em"
| 
| rowspan=3 | 22
| rowspan=3 | Elected in 2014.
| rowspan=6 nowrap | Jan 3, 2015 –Present
| rowspan=6  | Republican
| rowspan=6 align=right | Steve Daines
! rowspan=6 | 12

|- style="height:2em"
| 

|- style="height:2em"
| rowspan=3 | Re-elected in 2018.
| rowspan=3 | 23
| 

|- style="height:2em"
| 
| rowspan=3 | 23
| rowspan=3  |Re-elected in 2020.

|- style="height:2em"
| 

|- style="height:2em"
| rowspan=2 colspan=5 | To be determined in the 2024 election.
| rowspan=2|23
| 

|- style="height:2em"
| 
| 24
| colspan=5 | To be determined in the 2026 election.

See also

 List of United States representatives from Montana
 United States congressional delegations from Montana
 Elections in Montana

References

 
United States Senators
Montana